Pals and Pugs is a 1920 American silent comedy film featuring Oliver Hardy.

Cast
 Jimmy Aubrey as An outcast
 Dixie Lamont as An heiress
 Oliver Hardy as A bully (as Babe Hardy)
 Leo White as Beau Brummel

See also
 List of American films of 1920
 Oliver Hardy filmography

External links

1920 films
American silent short films
American black-and-white films
1920 comedy films
1920 short films
Films directed by Jess Robbins
Silent American comedy films
American comedy short films
1920s American films